Lok Sangharsh Morcha (People's Struggle Front) is led by Tarsem Jodhan, a former MLA who had represented the Communist Party of India (Marxist) in Punjab, India. It was formed in 2000.

Its membership comes primarily from brick-kiln workers, rural peasants, Mahatma Gandhi National Rural Employment Guarantee Act workers, and trade union workers.

 Political parties in Punjab, India
 Communist Party of India (Marxist) breakaway groups
2000 establishments in Punjab, India
 Political parties established in 2000